Cooke's Wells Station a stage station of the Butterfeild Overland Mail, located south of the Mexican border, in the old Alamos River bed, about 1 km west northwest of Mérida, Baja California. Its site was at Cooke's Wells, named for Philip St. George Cooke whose expedition found them in 1847.

Cooke's Wells were fed by spring flooding from the Colorado River along the course of the Alamo River that sank into the ground or formed small pools or lakes along its course that could provide water in the otherwise dry region.

References

San Antonio–San Diego Mail Line
Butterfield Overland Mail in Baja California
American frontier
Former populated places in Mexicali Municipality, Baja California
Stagecoach stops